Cullera is a city and municipality of Spain located in the Valencian Community. It is part of the province of Valencia and the Ribera Baixa comarca. The city is situated near the discharge of the river Júcar in the Mediterranean Sea.

Geography
Cullera is situated at the mouth of the Júcar river, 40 km from the capital of Valencia and 56 km from the international airport of Valencia aeropuerto de manises.

Areas in Cullera and hamlets
The parts and areas of Cullera are:

El Brosquil.
Cullera-Park.
Cap-Blanc.
El Dosel.
El Estany.
El Marenyet.
Mareny de San Lorenzo.
Mareny Blau.
Bega de Mar.
El Perelló.

Bordering cities
Sueca, Corbera, Llaurí, Favara, Alzira and Tavernes de Valldigna all neighbour Cullera. They are all in the province of Valencia.

Topography
The mountain of Cullera, known as Munt de l'Or or Muntanya de l'Or, is the last mountain in the Iberian System before the Mediterranean Sea. It has an altitude of 233 meters. The historical parts of the city are to the south, and the modern tourist district is to the east, looking to the sea.

The San Lorenzo lagoon is a small lake situated north of the mountain. It once formed part of a much bigger lake before the lands were drained for agricultural use. The lake now marks the southern limit of the Parque Natural de la Albufera.

Demographics

Economy
The economy in Cullera is traditionally based in agriculture, with rice and oranges as important crops. Fishing, historically a large part of the economy, has diminished in importance due to important tourism developments, both nationally and internationally, in the region. There is a port in Cullera named Puerto de Cullera which is connected with a municipal fish market named Lonja de Cullera.

Historical and artistic landmarks

Castle: At the top of the mountain, dominating the city and the sea, there is a fortress built in the 13th century over the old Moorish fortress. It once was walled, although those walls no longer remain. Located there are the rest of the old towers, forming part of the old walled area on the mountain.
Sanctuary of the Virgen del Castillo: (19th century) Within the fortress, there is the sanctuary of the Virgen del Castillo,  whose festival is celebrated the week after Passover.
Church of the Saint Johns: A neoclassical temple from the 17th century built over an older Gothic temple. Inside, there is a sacristía and the interior of a bell tower. The temple has recently been restored.
Torre del marenyet: An old watchtower built to watch the Júcar river. It was erected in the 15th century as a defense against barbary pirates.
Cave of Dragut: This cave depicts the invasion of the Berbers in Cullera, and it is said that the pirate Dragut was once there.
Air-raid shelter-Museum of the Mercat Municipal: A bomb shelter constructed under the Town's Market under the threat of air bombing during the Spanish Civil War.
Hermitage of the stone saints (Abdon and Sennen): The building, situated on a hill surrounded by rice crops, was dedicated to these saints because they are related to the welfare of the crops. Nowadays, the Hermitage, which was built in the 18th century, has been reconverted into a museum dedicated to rice, from species to crops and tools, which is very important for Valencian cuisine.
Abric Lambert cave paintings: Named after its discoverer Lambert Oliver, the Abric Lambert is located in the north-west side of the mountain. The paintings are several figures painted in a dark red shade with cruciforms and comb-shaped figures that have been interpreted as animal and human figures.

Food
The typical food of the region is the so-called Mediterranean diet, which is characterized by a rich selection of vegetables. In Cullera's orchards, there are many citrus crops (oranges, mandarins and lemons), as well as fish and seafood of the nearby sea.
Alongside the offerings of the orchards, not to mention the seafood, there are dozens of ways to prepare rice: arroz al horno, arroz a banda, etc.

Twin towns
  Le Bourget, France (1982)
  Ouroux-en-Morvan, France
  Jever, Germany (1998)
  Syktyvkar, Russia

See also 
 Mutiny at Sucro

References

External links

Instituto Valenciano de Estadística
Castillo de Cullera
https://web.archive.org/web/20060204235358/http://www.costamediterranea.com/dondeir/valencia/cullera.html
http://www.valencians.com/valencia/rb/cullera

Municipalities in the Province of Valencia
Mediterranean port cities and towns in Spain
Ribera Baixa
Seaside resorts in Spain